Josef Němec (born 24 July 1972) is a Czech football manager and former player. He played at a number of clubs in the Gambrinus liga, making over 200 appearances. He also played top-flight football in Mexico. He is currently the manager of FK Chmel Blšany, where he has operated since 2009.

References

External links

1972 births
Living people
Czech footballers
Czech First League players
Dukla Prague footballers
AC Sparta Prague players
FK Viktoria Žižkov players
Liga MX players
Cruz Azul footballers
FK Drnovice players
1. FK Příbram players
FK Chmel Blšany players
FC Viktoria Plzeň players
SK Dynamo České Budějovice players
Czech expatriate footballers
Expatriate footballers in Mexico
Czech football managers
FK Chmel Blšany managers

Association football midfielders